Demetrio Larena was a political hero and former governor of Negros Oriental (East Negros), a province on Negros Island in the Philippines. He was the vice-president of the Republic of Negros and eventually the governor of Negros Oriental from 1901 until 1906. Larena was instrumental in the establishment of Silliman University in Dumaguete.  When Dr. David Hibbard came to the Philippines to scout for a good location of the school that the Presbyterian Board of Foreign Missions wanted to be founded, Dumaguete was not one of the places originally contemplated. The places that were considered as prospects for the school's location were Iloilo, Cebu and Zamboanga.  But due in part to Larena's accommodating gesture and Dumaguete's natural environment at that time, Hibbard decided that the best place to establish the school would be in Dumaguete.

References

 Perez, Josefa Villanueva.Biography of Demetrio Larena, 1983 Cable Sun Press
 Larena, Josefino Jr Tulabing, Political life of Demetrio Larena, Silliman University South East Studies Program 2001 
 Larena, Leonaga Tulabing, Political life of Demetrio Larena, Bais City 1988
 Silliman University Church Parish News  April 2010
 Silliman University Church History Committee Historical Notes 2009-2010 
 Philippine Commission Annual Report 1903

Year of birth missing
Year of death missing
Governors of Negros Oriental
People of the Philippine Revolution
Silliman University people